A segula (pl. סגולות, segulot, "remedy" or "protection") is protective or benevolent charm or ritual in  Kabbalistic and Talmudic tradition.

Etymology
The word segula appears in the Hebrew Bible in Exodus 19:5 and Deuteronomy 7:6, where God refers to the Jewish nation as his segula (treasure). The root of this word, segol, is the name of a Hebrew vowel-point represented by three dots. According to the Ohr Hachaim, a segula is "a charm that supersedes logic".

List of segulot
Following is a list of popular or well-known segulot.

Fertility and childbirth
Distributing chai rotel (about 54 liters) of drink at the grave of Rabbi Shimon bar Yochai in Meron, Israel on Lag BaOmer is considered a propitious remedy for infertility, as well as for helping a person find his mate or recover from serious illness
Acting as kvatterin for a baby boy at his brit milah is a segula for childless couples to have children of their own
 studying of works of Kabbalist Zera Shimshon (his only child predeceased him)
Eating an etrog or etrog jam facilitates an easy childbirth
Drinking from the waters of Ein Sataf in Israel prevents a breech birth
Wearing a ruby helps prevent miscarriage and eases birth. Ingesting ground up rubies enhances the chance of pregnancy.

Protection from harm

Wearing a red string cut from a longer length that has been wound around Rachel's Tomb is an ancient tradition that protects the wearer from danger The only classic source which does mention the red thread expressly forbids its use, saying that tying a red thread on one’s fingers is an idolatrous practice ("darkei emori").
Giving tzedaka (charity) money to a traveler to donate when he arrives at his destination helps protect the traveler from harm
Concentrating on the phrase Ein Od Milvado ("There is none but Him [God]") shields a person from danger

Marriage
Praying at the grave of Rabbi Jonathan ben Uzziel in Amuka, Israel is considered propitious for finding one’s mate within the coming year
Praying at the Western Wall for 40 consecutive days is considered a segula for finding one’s mate
Holding the jewelry of a bride while she is escorted to her chuppah is a segula for finding one’s own mate

Other
 Buying a burial plot is a segula for a long life
Placing a pigeon on a person’s navel is efficacious for curing jaundice
Giving tzedaka in the merit of Rabbi Meir Baal Hanes is a segula for finding a lost object
Buying a new knife for Rosh Hashanah is a propitious remedy for livelihood
One can hang a special note around the neck of a chicken and use it to identify a thief

References

External links
What Are Segulos and How Do They Work?
Segulos and Tefillos (Shidduchim)

Kabbalistic words and phrases
Hebrew words and phrases in the Hebrew Bible
Talmud concepts and terminology